Herrold is a surname of Anglo-Saxon origin, meaning "love of the army". Notable people with the surname include:

Charles Herrold (1875-1948), American inventor and pioneer radio broadcaster
Maurice Herrold (1869-1949), New Zealand rugby union player
Myha'la Herrold (born 1996), American actress

See also
Herrold, Iowa, an unincorporated community
Herrold Bridge, a historic bridge near Herrold, Iowa
Herrold Run, a tributary of the Susquehanna river in Pennsylvania
Herold (surname)
Harrold (surname)